The Eighteen Arms is a list of the eighteen main weapons of Chinese martial arts. The origin of the list is unclear and there have been disputes as to what the eighteen weapons actually are. However, all lists contain at least one or more of the following weapons:

Wuzazu version
The  , written by the Ming-dynasty Fujianese scholar  (1567–1624), lists the following: 

Axe
Bow and arrow
Crossbow
Dao (Chinese sword)
Greataxe
Hand-to-hand combat
Hoko yari
Ji (halberd)
Jian
Jian (sword breaker)
Whip
Mace
Pick
Qiang (spear)
Rake (tool)
Rope dart
Shield
Trident

Water Margin version
The Ming novel Water Margin lists the following:

Ancient style spear
Axe
Bow and arrow
Chain
Chúi
Club (weapon)
Crossbow
Dagger axe
halberd
Firearm
Greataxe
Jian (sword breaker)
Mace or whip
Pick
Shield
Spear
Sword
Trident

Shaolin version

Axe
Broadsword
Cane
Dart
Flute
Fork
Hand Dart
Kwan Dao
Monk's spade
Pen
Pu Dao
Sickles
Spear
Staff
Sword
Thorn
Tri-point double-edge sword
Whip

Other version

Axe
Blade
Club
Double-edged sword
Greataxe
Gun (staff)
Halberd
Hook sword
Jian (sword breaker)
Long spear
Mace
Meteor hammer
Pick
Ranseur
Spear
Tonfa
Trident
Whip

See also
Legendary Weapons of China

External links
The Eighteen Weapons(Translated)

Chinese culture-related lists
Chinese melee weapons
Chinese martial arts